is a Japanese fantasy light novel series written by Sei Takekawa and illustrated by Mutsumi Inomata. The Weathering Continent centers on three travelers – the delicately beautiful sorcerer Tieh, the burly and reticent warrior Bois, and the spritely young Lakshi – as they trek through the shattered wastelands of the ancient continent of Atlantis.

The first installment of The Weathering Continent was published in Monthly Dragon Magazine in April 1988, with a total of 28 collected novels released from November 1990 to April 2006. An anime feature film based on the novels was also released theatrically in Japan on July 18, 1992. It is available in the United States courtesy of Media Blasters. During the novels' original run, several side stories were published. A short, sequel series also followed when the original The Weathering Continent ended.

Media

Novels
The Weathering Continent, serial novels written by Sei Takekawa and illustrated by Mutsumi Inomata, was first serialized in the Fujimi Shobo seinen publication Monthly Dragon Magazine in the April 1990 issue. The series totals 28 collected volumes. The first was released on November 11, 1988 and the last was released on April 20, 2006. The entire The Weathering Continent series was also collected into five larger volumes and published on September 28, 2007.

During the publication of The Weathering Continent, several related stories were issued: The three volume ; the three volume ; and the single volume . A sequel light novel series, has been published in two volumes by Kadokawa Haruki Corporation from November 2010 to March 2011.

Anime film
The Weathering Continent anime film was produced by I.G. Tatsunoko (later Production I.G) and released theatrically in Japan on July 18, 1992 as part of a triple bill with The Heroic Legend of Arislan II and Silent Möbius: The Motion Picture 2. It was written and directed by Kōichi Mashimo and features character designs by Nobuteru Yūki and music by Michiru Oshima. The film made its way to VHS in Japan via Bandai on December 16, 1992. It has aired on both the NHK network and the Bandai Channel. The film was localized in the United States by Media Blasters with English voice recordings by NYAV Post. It was released on DVD on July 29, 2003. The film was aired on the Starz network channels throughout 2006.

CDs and artbooks
A number of audio CDs relating to The Weathering Continent have been published in Japan. An original soundtrack to the anime film, consisting of a total of 25 background and vocal tracks, was released in two volumes by Victor Entertainment on July 18, 1991 and January 21, 1993. The company also released CD singles for the anime's vocal songs by Yui Nishiwaki and Arai Akino.

Three art books based on The Weathering Continent have also been issued: Mutsumi Inomata Paintings Collection The Weathering Continent: Un Ballo en Maschera, Dragon Magazine Collection The Weathering Continent The Approach of Atlantis, and Fujimi Fantasia Comics: The Weathering Continent.

Reviews from Outside of Japan
Brian Hanson of the Anime News Network had high expectations for the anime, but was ultimately bored by it. He summarized the film as "a group of mopey kids on a dying mid-Atlantic continent from long, long ago comment on their bleak lives and their bleak world and how bleak everything is". Raphael See of THEM Anime Reviews made similar comments, calling the pace of the plot "a little faster than the diffusion of molasses through a granite wall" and that the key characters constantly reflect on past events.

References

External links
 
 

1988 manga
1990 Japanese novels
1992 anime films
2010 Japanese novels
Adventure anime and manga
Fujimi Fantasia Bunko
Kadokawa Dwango franchises
Japanese serial novels
Light novels
Production I.G
Seinen manga
Japanese fantasy novels
1990 fantasy novels
2010s fantasy novels
1990s Japanese-language films
Japanese animated fantasy films
Films based on Japanese novels
Japanese novels adapted into films
1992 fantasy films